Lauri Halonen (24 March 1894 – 27 May 1961) was a Finnish long-distance runner. He competed in the marathon at the 1924 Summer Olympics.

References

External links
 

1894 births
1961 deaths
Sportspeople from Vaasa
People from Vaasa Province (Grand Duchy of Finland)
Athletes (track and field) at the 1924 Summer Olympics
Finnish male long-distance runners
Finnish male marathon runners
Olympic athletes of Finland